Robert Cowan (3 May 1880 – 11 November 1962) was an Australian cricketer. He played four first-class matches for South Australia between 1904 and 1906.

See also
 List of South Australian representative cricketers

References

External links
 

1880 births
1962 deaths
Australian cricketers
South Australia cricketers
Cricketers from Adelaide